Wyboo is a lakeside community and census-designated place (CDP) in Clarendon County, South Carolina, United States. It was first listed as a CDP prior to the 2020 census with a population of 3,661.

The CDP is in southern Clarendon County, on both sides of Wyboo Swamp, an arm of Lake Marion, the largest lake in South Carolina. South Carolina Highway 260 passes through the east side of the community, leading north  to Manning, the county seat. The south end of Highway 260 is at the Santee Dam, which forms Lake Marion by impounding the Santee River.

Demographics

2020 census

Note: the US Census treats Hispanic/Latino as an ethnic category. This table excludes Latinos from the racial categories and assigns them to a separate category. Hispanics/Latinos can be of any race.

References 

Census-designated places in Clarendon County, South Carolina
Census-designated places in South Carolina